Den Saakaldte is a Norwegian black metal supergroup, founded in 2006 by Mikael Sykelig, featuring members of Shining, 1349 and Dødheimsgard, among others. It takes its name from a song by Ved Buens Ende.

History
They played their first concert at Inferno Festival in 2008, headlining the John Dee stage on the second day. The reactions were positive.

Their debut album, Øl, Mørke og Depresjon, which was released in March 2008 through Eerie Art records, has been described as "a quite unique sounding album," as well as "there's space for aggression and brutality, but also for dark atmospheres and ancient feelings."

The band released their second album, entitled All Hail Pessimism, on February 2, 2009.

On 27 March 2011, Niklas Kvarforth, vocalist and frontman of Den Saakaldte, announced that he would be quitting the band to focus on Shining.

Members

Current
 Jan Fredrik "Xarim" Solheim - lead vocals
 Mikael Sykelig - guitar
 Vidar Fineidet - guitar
 Hugh Steven James "Skoll" Mingay - bass
 Daniel "Tybalt" Theobald - drums

Former
 Niklas Kvarforth - vocals
 Jarle "Uruz" Byberg - drums
 Jan Axel "Hellhammer" Blomberg - drums
 Stian Winter - drums
 Øyvind Hægeland - vocals
 Tor Risdal "Seidemann" Stavenes - bass
 Jormundgand - keyboards, arrangements

Discography 
 Øl, mørke og depresjon (2008)
 Die Hard Version (Split With Shining) (2008)
 All Hail Pessimism (2009)
 Faen i helvete (2014)

References

Norwegian black metal musical groups
Musical groups established in 2006
2006 establishments in Norway
Musical groups from Oslo